Aseri Landscape Conservation Area is a nature park situated in Lääne-Viru County, Estonia.

Its area is 611 ha. 

The protected area was designated in 2007 to protect nature of and near Aseri Cliff.

References

Nature reserves in Estonia
Geography of Lääne-Viru County